Cornelius Francis Xavier Flynn  (January 23, 1875 – February 10, 1947) was a professional baseball player.

References

1875 births
1947 deaths
Major League Baseball pitchers
Baseball players from Ohio
Cincinnati Reds players
19th-century baseball players
New York Giants (NL) players
Washington Senators (1891–1899) players
Mobile Bluebirds players
Nashville Tigers players
Richmond Blue Birds players
New York Metropolitans (minor league) players
Richmond Giants players